Mikulak is a surname. Notable people with this surname include:
Sam Mikulak (born 1992), American artistic gymnast
Mike Mikulak (1912–1999), American football player
Stephen A. Mikulak (1948–2014), American politician

See also  
 Mikulík

Surnames from given names